Malawi Revenue Authority (MRA) is the revenue service and a government agency of the Malawi government. Malawi Revenue Authority is responsible for collecting taxes. The duties of the Malawi Revenue Authority include providing tax assistance to taxpayers and pursuing and resolving instances of erroneous or fraudulent tax filings.

Revenue collection 
Malawi Revenue Authority is responsible for assessing, collecting and accounting for revenue through the Ministry of Finance. The revenues and taxes administered by Malawi Revenue Authority include;

References

External links 

 

Revenue services
Customs services